The 2006–07 Miami Heat season was the 19th season for the franchise in the National Basketball Association (NBA). The Heat, for the first time in franchise history, entered the season as the defending NBA champions, having defeated the Dallas Mavericks in the 2006 NBA Finals in six games. On January 3, 2007, head coach Pat Riley took a leave of absence citing hip and knee problems and was replaced by Ron Rothstein. Despite injuries to several players, including Shaquille O'Neal and Dwyane Wade, the Heat repeated as Southeast division champions. With a record of 44–38, it was clear that the Heat was not the same team of years past. The Heat ended the season with a four-game playoff loss in a sweep to the Chicago Bulls in the first round and the Heat became the first defending NBA champions since the Philadelphia Warriors back in 1957 to be swept in the first round. Following the season, Gary Payton retired.

Key dates
 June 28 – The 2006 NBA draft took place in New York City.
 July 8 – The free agency period started.
 October 10 – The Heat played their first preseason game versus the Detroit Pistons at Coliseo de Puerto Rico in San Juan, Puerto Rico.
 October 31 – The Heat's regular season began with a home game versus the Chicago Bulls. Where the championship rings were handed out to the members of the 05-06 Championship team

Offseason

2006 NBA draft
The Miami Heat had no selections in the 2006 NBA draft after the following trades:
  On July 14, 2004, the L.A. Lakers acquired a 2006 first-round draft pick, Lamar Odom, Caron Butler and Brian Grant from Miami in exchange for Shaquille O'Neal. The L.A. Lakers used the 26th pick to draft Jordan Farmar.
  On January 31, 2006, Toronto acquired Miami's 2006 second-round draft pick and New Orleans's 2009 second-round draft pick  from New Orleans/Oklahoma City in exchange for Aaron Williams. Previously, New Orleans/Oklahoma City acquired Miami's 2006 second-round draft pick on September 30, 2005 from Boston in exchange for Dan Dickau. Previously, Boston acquired 2006 and 2008 second-round draft picks, Qyntel Woods and the draft rights to Albert Miralles on August 8, 2005 from Miami in a five-team trade with Miami, Memphis, New Orleans/Oklahoma City and Utah. Toronto used the 56th pick to draft Edin Bavčić.

Roster

Pre-season

Regular season

Standings

Record vs. opponents

Game log

Playoffs

|- align="center" bgcolor="#ffcccc"
| 1
| April 21
| @ Chicago
| L 91–96
| Dwyane Wade (21)
| O'Neal, Haslem (6)
| five players tied (3)
| United Center22,183
| 0–1
|- align="center" bgcolor="#ffcccc"
| 2
| April 24
| @ Chicago
| L 89–107
| Dwyane Wade (21)
| O'Neal, Posey (8)
| Dwyane Wade (7)
| United Center23,097
| 0–2
|- align="center" bgcolor="#ffcccc"
| 3
| April 27
| Chicago
| L 96–104
| Dwyane Wade (28)
| Shaquille O'Neal (13)
| Dwyane Wade (5)
| American Airlines Arena20,280
| 0–3
|- align="center" bgcolor="#ffcccc"
| 4
| April 29
| Chicago
| L 79–92
| Dwyane Wade (24)
| James Posey (18)
| Dwyane Wade (10)
| American Airlines Arena20,283
| 0–4
|-

Player statistics

Regular season 

|-
| 
| 28 || 0 || 7.3 || .289 || .000 || style=";"| .944 || 1.5 || .2 || .2 || .1 || 2.3
|-
| 
| 56 || 0 || 12.5 || .469 || .000 || .878 || 2.8 || .4 || .3 || .3 || 3.6
|-
| 
| style=";"| 79 || style=";"| 79 || 31.4 || .492 || .000 || .680 || style=";"| 8.3 || 1.2 || .6 || .3 || 10.7
|-
| 
| 12 || 0 || 11.3 || .317 || .217 || .667 || 1.3 || .7 || .3 || .2 || 4.3
|-
| 
| 35 || 27 || 29.5 || .446 || .378 || .829 || 3.7 || 2.2 || 1.3 || .2 || 9.5
|-
| 
| 67 || 35 || 26.4 || .494 || style=";"| .514 || .892 || 2.7 || 1.2 || .6 || .0 || 10.9
|-
| 
| 77 || 43 || 20.4 || .560 || . || .601 || 4.5 || .2 || .2 || style=";"| 2.3 || 8.6
|-
| 
| 40 || 39 || 28.4 || style=";"| .591 || . || .422 || 7.4 || 2.0 || .2 || 1.4 || 17.3
|-
| 
| 68 || 28 || 22.1 || .393 || .260 || .667 || 1.9 || 3.0 || .6 || .0 || 5.3
|-
| 
| 71 || 19 || 27.0 || .431 || .375 || .827 || 5.0 || 1.3 || 1.0 || .3 || 7.7
|-
| 
| 42 || 1 || 9.7 || .366 || .351 || .676 || .7 || 1.5 || .4 || .0 || 3.4
|-
| 
| 8 || 0 || 11.6 || .391 || . || .714 || 1.4 || .5 || .3 || .0 || 2.9
|-
| 
| 51 || 50 || style=";"| 37.9 || .491 || .266 || .807 || 4.7 || style=";"| 7.5 || style=";"| 2.1 || 1.2 || style=";"| 27.4
|-
| 
| 78 || 15 || 23.3 || .397 || .275 || .438 || 4.3 || 1.7 || .6 || .2 || 8.5
|-
| 
| 61 || 55 || 30.6 || .413 || .339 || .913 || 2.3 || 5.3 || 1.0 || .0 || 10.9
|-
| 
| 66 || 19 || 19.6 || .445 || .147 || .744 || 4.1 || 1.4 || .6 || .7 || 6.0
|}

Playoffs

|-
| 
| 1 || 0 || 1.0 || . || . || . || .0 || .0 || .0 || .0 || .0
|-
| 
| style=";"| 4 || style=";"| 4 || 25.8 || .480 || . || .750 || 5.3 || 1.0 || .3 || .5 || 7.5
|-
| 
| 3 || 2 || 22.0 || .222 || .167 || .833 || 2.0 || 1.7 || .3 || .3 || 3.3
|-
| 
| style=";"| 4 || 1 || 19.3 || .471 || style=";"| .500 || style=";"| 1.000 || 1.3 || .5 || .5 || .0 || 5.0
|-
| 
| style=";"| 4 || 0 || 13.8 || style=";"| .909 || . || .385 || 2.0 || .3 || .0 || .8 || 6.3
|-
| 
| style=";"| 4 || style=";"| 4 || 30.3 || .559 || . || .333 || style=";"| 8.5 || 1.3 || .3 || style=";"| 1.5 || 18.8
|-
| 
| 2 || 0 || 16.0 || .000 || .000 || . || 2.0 || 1.5 || .0 || .0 || .0
|-
| 
| style=";"| 4 || 1 || 34.8 || .431 || .385 || style=";"| 1.000 || 7.8 || 1.5 || style=";"| 2.0 || 1.3 || 7.8
|-
| 
| style=";"| 4 || style=";"| 4 || style=";"| 40.5 || .429 || .000 || .688 || 4.8 || style=";"| 6.3 || 1.3 || .5 || style=";"| 23.5
|-
| 
| style=";"| 4 || 0 || 23.0 || .405 || style=";"| .500 || .818 || 2.3 || 1.5 || .5 || .3 || 11.8
|-
| 
| style=";"| 4 || style=";"| 4 || 28.0 || .250 || .294 || .800 || 2.0 || 3.5 || 1.3 || .3 || 5.8
|-
| 
| 1 || 0 || 1.0 || . || . || . || .0 || .0 || .0 || .0 || .0
|}

Awards, records and milestones

Awards

Week/Month

All-Star

Season

Records

Milestones

Injuries and surgeries

Transactions

Trades

Free agents

Additions

Subtractions

References

Miami Heat seasons
Miami Heat
Miami Heat
Miami Heat